Rafat or RAFAT may refer to:

Rafat, Jerusalem, Palestinian town in Jerusalem Governorate
Rafat, Salfit, Palestinian town in Salfit Governorate
Rafat (given name)
Rafat (surname)
Royal Air Force Aerobatic Team, also known as the Red Arrows.

See also
Deir Rafat
Dayr Rafat